Pontes Gestal is a municipality in the state of São Paulo in Brazil. The population is 2,577 (2020 est.) in an area of 218 km2. The elevation is 449 m.

References

Municipalities in São Paulo (state)